Helgi Hall­v­arðsson (12 June 1931 – 15 March 2008) was an Icelandic commander in the Icelandic Coast Guard. During his 55-year service with the Coast Guard, he took part in all three Anglo-Icelandic Cod Wars where he was nicknamed "Mad Helgi", "The Maddest Axeman" and "Napoleon of the North" by the British due to his aggressive tactics.

Life 
Helgi was born in Reykjavík to Guðfinna Lýðsdótt­ir and Hall­v­arður Rós­inkars­son, both from Skógarströnd.

Honours 
 : Knight of the Order of St. Olav (1974)
 : Knight of the Order of the Falcon (1976)

References 

1931 births
2008 deaths
Grand Knights of the Order of the Falcon
Order of Saint Olav
People from Reykjavík